28th Street/Little Portugal station is a proposed underground Bay Area Rapid Transit station in the Little Portugal neighborhood of San Jose, California. It would be located north of East Santa Clara Street between North 28th Street and U.S. Route 101, behind Five Wounds Portuguese National Church. Preceded by the Berryessa/North San Jose BART station, it would be the first station of the Phase II portion of the Silicon Valley BART extension. The station would have direct service to Santa Clara, Richmond, and San Francisco/Daly City. In planning, the station was referred to as Alum Rock/28th Street, after the Alum Rock neighborhood to the northeast.

History
A separate extension was built from Fremont to Warm Springs station in the Warm Springs District (also in Fremont). This was followed by phase I of the Silicon Valley BART extension into eastern San Jose, built by VTA. The entire San Jose/Santa Clara extension, including Alum Rock station (as it was referred to at the time), was originally intended to be built in a single project, but funding could not be secured; therefore, the San Jose extension was split into two phases, and Alum Rock was placed in the second phase. On November 7, 2019, VTA renamed the station to 28th Street/Little Portugal in response to community feedback. If funding is secured, construction is slated to begin in 2020, and open to passenger service in 2029–2030. This station will be located between the Berryessa/North San José and Downtown San Jose Stations and will be served by VTA buses.

References

External links
 VTA station project homepage

Future Bay Area Rapid Transit stations
Bay Area Rapid Transit stations in Santa Clara County, California
Railway stations in San Jose, California
Proposed public transportation in California
Railway stations scheduled to open in 2029
Railway stations located underground in California